Pella is a comune (municipality) in the Province of Novara in the Italian region Piedmont, located about  northeast of Turin and about  northwest of Novara on the Lake Orta. It borders the municipalities of Cesara, Madonna del Sasso, Nonio, Orta San Giulio, Pettenasco, and San Maurizio d'Opaglio.

References

External links
 Official website

Cities and towns in Piedmont